The 2005 Spanish motorcycle Grand Prix was the first round of the 2005 MotoGP Championship. It took place on the weekend of 8–10 April 2005 at Jerez.

MotoGP classification

250 cc classification

125 cc classification

Championship standings after the race (motoGP)

Below are the standings for the top five riders and constructors after round one has concluded.

Riders' Championship standings

Constructors' Championship standings

 Note: Only the top five positions are included for both sets of standings.

References

Spanish motorcycle Grand Prix
Spanish
Motorcycle Grand Prix